The Gradient Aspen is a Czech single-place, paraglider designed and produced by Gradient sro of Prague. Introduced in 2003, it remained in production in 2016 as the Aspen 5.

Design and development
The Aspen was designed as an intermediate sport glider.

The design has progressed through five generations of models, the Aspen, Aspen 2, 3, 4 and 5, each improving on the last. The models are each named for their approximate wing area in square metres.

Variants
Aspen 24
Small-sized model for lighter pilots. The glider model is DHV 2 certified.
Aspen 26
Mid-sized model for medium-weight pilots. The glider model is DHV 2 certified.
Aspen 28
Large-sized model for heavier pilots. The glider model is DHV 2 certified.
Aspen 3 22
Extra small-sized model for lighter pilots. The glider model is EN/LTF-C2 certified and has a glide ratio of 9:1.
Aspen 3 24
Small-sized model for lighter pilots. The glider model is EN/LTF-C2 certified and has a glide ratio of 9:1.
Aspen 3 26
Mid-sized model for medium-weight pilots. The glider model is EN/LTF-C2 certified and has a glide ratio of 9:1.
Aspen 3 28
Large-sized model for heavier pilots. The glider model is EN/LTF-C2 certified and has a glide ratio of 9:1.
Aspen 3 30
Extra large-sized model for much heavier pilots. The glider model is EN/LTF-C2 certified and has a glide ratio of 9:1.
Aspen 4 22
Extra small-sized model for lighter pilots. The glider model is EN/LTF-C certified and has a glide ratio of 10:1.
Aspen 4 24
Small-sized model for lighter pilots. The glider model is EN/LTF-C certified and has a glide ratio of 10:1.
Aspen 4 26
Mid-sized model for medium-weight pilots. The glider model is EN/LTF-C certified and has a glide ratio of 10:1.
Aspen 4 28
Large-sized model for heavier pilots. The glider model is EN/LTF-C certified and has a glide ratio of 10:1.
Aspen 4 30
Extra large-sized model for much heavier pilots. The glider model is EN/LTF-C certified and has a glide ratio of 10:1.
Aspen 5 24
Small-sized model for lighter pilots. The glider model is EN-C certified.
Aspen 5 26
Mid-sized model for medium-weight pilots. The glider model is EN-C certified.
Aspen 5 28
Large-sized model for heavier pilots. The glider model is EN-C certified.

Specifications (Aspen 26)

References

External links

Aspen
Paragliders